Braidwood Generating Station is located in Will County in northeastern Illinois, U.S. The nuclear power plant serves Chicago and northern Illinois with electricity. The plant was originally built by Commonwealth Edison company, and subsequently transferred to Com Ed's parent company, Exelon Corporation. Following Exelon's spin-off of their Generation company, the station was transferred to Constellation Energy.

This station has two Westinghouse pressurized water reactors. Unit #1 came online in July 1987. Unit #2 came online in May 1988. The units were licensed by the Nuclear Regulatory Commission to operate until 2026 and 2027, then granted extended licenses until 2046 and 2047. Each unit has received two power uprates during their lifetime, the first in May 2001 for 175.6 MWt and the second in February 2014 for 58.4 MWt.

The power uprates at Braidwood granted in 2001 make it the largest nuclear plant in the state, generating a net total of 2,386 megawatts.  However the three largest Illinois nuclear power plants are nearly equal in generating capability as LaSalle County Nuclear Generating Station is only 2 MW less in capacity than Braidwood and Byron Nuclear Generating Station is only 4 MW less than LaSalle.

Electricity generation

Surrounding population

The 2010 U.S. population within  of Braidwood was 33,910, an increase of 6.5 percent in a decade, according to an analysis of U.S. Census data for msnbc.com. The 2010 U.S. population within  was 4,976,020, an increase of 5.3 percent since 2000. Cities within 50 miles include Joliet (20 miles to city center), as well as parts of both Aurora and Naperville (42 miles to city center).

Tritium leaks 
Exelon was sued by residents of Will County and by the state's attorney in 2006. The lawsuit alleges that the Braidwood plant released radioactive tritium into local water in violation of its permit. However, the US NRC has said the response is based on "emotion, not risk", and gone on record to state the tritium releases did not jeopardize human health or safety in any manner.  The Illinois EPA also reported that all tests have confirmed releases are below the action levels of 20,000 picoCuries per liter, currently set by the EPA.  However, Exelon agreed to provide bottled water to residents of Godley and to residents within 1500 feet of the blowdown line to the Kankakee River.

Seismic risk
The Nuclear Regulatory Commission's estimate of the risk each year of an earthquake intense enough to cause core damage to the reactor at Braidwood was 1 in 136,986, according to an NRC study published in August 2010.

See also

 List of largest power stations in the United States
 Largest nuclear power plants in the United States

Notes

References

Further reading

External links
Braidwood Nuclear Generating Station official website

Energy infrastructure completed in 1988
Buildings and structures in Will County, Illinois
Nuclear power plants in Illinois
Nuclear power stations using pressurized water reactors
Exelon